The Milton S. Eisenhower Symposium is a lecture series sponsored by Johns Hopkins University. The Symposium runs each year over the course of the fall semester, as a counterpart to the Foreign Affairs Symposium.

History 
Established in 1967, the MSE Symposium is designed to present an issue of national importance to the university in its entirety, as well as to the Baltimore and Washington D.C. communities. The series is named in honor of Milton S. Eisenhower, who served as University President from 1956-1967 and again from 1971-1972. He was the younger brother of U.S. President Dwight D. Eisenhower. The Symposium has established a reputation as a forum for the free exchange of ideas and the analysis of issues at the forefront of the nation’s conscience. All events are free and open to the public.

Leadership 
The Symposium is run entirely by undergraduate students at the University’s Homewood Campus. The co-chairs are responsible for choosing a theme, securing speakers, raising the necessary funds, recruiting a student staff, and publicizing the series. There is a staff of about 20 students.
The chairs for the 2019 symposium are Siena DeMatteo, Taran Krishnan, Mickey Sloat, and Dave Taylor.

Symposium structure 

Symposium events are held on the Homewood Campus of the Johns Hopkins University. Each speaker delivers an address to attendees, usually followed by a question-and-answer session with the audience. Additionally, some speakers hold a meet and greet session with the audience after the event.

Symposium themes

2019
"The Butterfly Effect"

Shannon Watts, gun control activist and founder of Moms Demand Action; Kenan Thompson, comedian and SNL cast member; Jim Acosta, journalist and CNN Chief White House Correspondent; Farida Nabourema, activist and blogger.

Chairs: Siena DeMatteo, Taran Krishnan, Dave Taylor, and Mickey Sloat

2018
"The New Social Contract"

Chairs: Alex Kaplan, Alejo Perez-Stable Husni, Indira Rayala, and Maddy Speal

2017
"Celebrating 50 Years"

Chairs: Rachel Biderman, Abby Biesman, Charles Crepy, and Tiffany Le

2016
"Facing Fracture"

Chairs: Sam Sands, Theodore Kupfer, Olivia Choi, and Eyal Foni

2015
Voices that Shaped Today, Visions that Frame Tomorrow

Chairs: Jeremy Fraenkel, Nicole Michelson, Ariel Zahler, and Nadeem Bandealy

2014
The Generation Electric: Recharging the Promise of Tomorrow

Chairs: Annabel Barnicke, Daniel Elkin, P. Nash Jenkins, and Connor Kenehan

2013
Learning from Experience: The Path Ahead for Generation Y

Chairs: Aidan Christofferson, Aaron Tessler, Francesca Pinelli, and Elias Rosenblatt

2012
The Power of the Individual: How One Voice can Change the World

Chairs: Chris Alvarez, Corey Rogoff, Eva Marie, and Najarro Smith

2011
America's Boundless Possibilities: Innovate, Advance, Transform

Chairs: Jonathan Kornblau, Elizabeth Goodstein, and Jon Mest

2010
The Global Network: America's Changing Role in an Interconnected World

Chairs: Mohammad Elsayed, Danielle Calderone, and Nicole Ackerman

2009
A Transition Between Generations in a Changing America

Chairs: Danielle Fair, Michelle Harran, and Daniel Ingram

2008
A More Perfect Union: Partnership, Progress & Prosperity

Chairs: Omar Atassi, Zachary Epstein-Peterson, Brian Kim, and Lily Seidel

2007
Renewing American Culture: The Perspectives that Shape our Identity

Chairs: Jon Bernhardt, Jonathan Collins, and Nora Krinitsky

2006
Finding Our Voice: The Role of America's Youth

2005
American Mass Media: Redefining the Democratic Landscape

2004
Rebuilding America: Peace and Prosperity at What Price?

2003
The Great American Experiment: a Juxtaposition of Capitalism and Democracy

1999
Redefining the Role of the Media

Noah Wyle and Eriq La Salle of the ER (TV series), Dr. Drew Pinsky, co-host of Loveline, the popular show on both radio and MTV; Supreme Court Justice Antonin Scalia, of the United States Supreme Court; Oliver Stone, Academy Award-winning American screenwriter and filmmaker's credits include Born on the Fourth of July, JFK, Platoon, Natural Born Killers and Wall Street; Phoebe Eng, author of Warrior Lessons: An Asian American Woman's Journey Into Power. She is also the co-founding publisher of A. Magazine, a national consumer magazine targeted to the Asian population in the U.S.; Nadine Strossen, president of the American Civil Liberties Union in 1991. A professor of law at New York Law School, she has written, lectured and practiced extensively in the areas of constitutional law, civil liberties and international human rights.

Chairs: Feras Mousilli and Sehla Ashai

1995
Framing Society: A Century of Cinema

Chairs: Chris Aldrich and Matt Gross

1993
Who Am I? The Changing Role of Human Sexuality

Chairs: Aneesh Chopra and Joe Molko

1973
Living With Change

Former Speakers 
The Symposium has a history of attracting some of the world’s most prominent leaders, politicians, artists, and scholars. Past MSE Symposium speakers include:

Jason Alexander
Maya Angelou
Aziz Ansari
Sean Astin
David Axelrod
Michael Bloomberg
Cory Booker
Tucker Carlson
Ben Carson
Rubin “Hurricane” Carter
Noam Chomsky
Tom Clancy
Francis Collins
Ann Coulter
Howard Dean
Michael Dukakis
Elizabeth Edwards
Ruth Faden
Will Ferrell
Gerald Ford
Buckminster Fuller
Newt Gingrich
Malcolm Gladwell
Danny Glover
David Alan Grier
Christopher Hitchens
David Horowitz
Jon Huntsman, Jr.
Jesse Jackson
John Kasich
Rory Kennedy
Nelson Mandela
N. Gregory Mankiw
Chris Matthews
Eugene McCarthy
Gail McGovern
Seth Meyers
Hasan Minhaj
Michael Moore
Wes Moore
Ralph Nader
Edward James Olmos
Ron Paul
Charles Percy
Craig Robinson
Karl Rove
Linda Sarsour
Antonin Scalia
Congressman Aaron Schock
Michael Steele
Megan Twohey
Jimmy Wales
Dr. Ruth Westheimer
Jessica Williams
Valerie Plame Wilson
Bob Woodward
Howard Zinn

References

External links
MSE Website

Johns Hopkins University
1967 establishments in Maryland